Tommy Haas was the defending champion, but lost in quarterfinals to Vincent Spadea.

Xavier Malisse won in the final 5–7, 6–4, 6–4 against James Blake.

Seeds

 James Blake (final)
 Tommy Haas (quarterfinals)
 Xavier Malisse (champion)
 Benjamin Becker (semifinals)
 Florian Mayer (quarterfinals)
 Philipp Kohlschreiber (round robin)
 Guillermo García-López (quarterfinals)
 Vincent Spadea (semifinals)

Draw

Finals

Round robin

Elimination round
Prior to the round robin and after the completion of the qualifying draws, the 16 players with the lowest tier in the tournament (4 qualifiers, 3 wild cards and 9 based on ATP rankings) competed in the elimination round in order to get one of the 8 last spots into the round robin competition. Winners in this round entered as main entrants.

Qualifying

Seeds

 Santiago Giraldo (qualifying competition)
 Hugo Armando (qualifying competition)
 Benedikt Dorsch (first round)
 Alan Mackin (first round)
 Todd Widom (FIrst round)
 Michael Lammer (qualifying competition)
 Frédéric Niemeyer (qualifying competition)
 Sergiy Stakhovsky (qualified)

Qualifiers

Qualifying draw

First qualifier

Second qualifier

Third qualifier

Fourth qualifier

External links
Main Draw
Qualifying draw

Singles
2007 ATP Tour